Sarah Sheard (born February 13, 1953 in Toronto, Ontario) is a Canadian novelist.

Sheard published her first novel, Almost Japanese, in 1985. Her latest novel, her first political fiction, came out in fall, 2012. She has been a creative writing instructor at Glendon College was a member of the editorial board of Coach House Press for 13 years and has been a writing mentor with the Humber School for Writers at Humber College since 1995. Her short videos about her novel, Krank: Love in the New Dark Times, are viewable on VIMEO. She also rides (Western reining) competitively and several of her reining videos are viewable on VIMEO.

She is in private practice as a psychotherapist with an MA in Counselling Psych, certification as a Gestalt Therapist and certified as a mediator. She specializes in couple and family counselling.

She is the sister of pop singer Mia Sheard and pianist John Sheard, and the great-great-granddaughter of Joseph Sheard, a former mayor of Toronto.

Books
 Almost Japanese (1985
 The Swing Era (1993)
 The Hypnotist (1999)
 Krank: Love in the New Dark Times (2012)

External links
Sarah Sheard
Krank the Book by Sheard
Sarah Sheard archives at the Clara Thomas Archives and Special Collections, York University Libraries, Toronto, Ontario

1953 births
Living people
Canadian women novelists
Writers from Toronto
Canadian psychotherapists
20th-century Canadian novelists
21st-century Canadian novelists

21st-century Canadian women writers
20th-century Canadian women writers
Academic staff of Glendon College